Iván Arcides Barton Cisneros (born 27 January 1991) is a Salvadoran football referee who is a listed international referee for FIFA since 2018. He is also one of the referees at the Primera División de Fútbol de El Salvador.

Biography

Barton was born in Santa Ana on 27 January 1991. In addition to being a professional referee, he obtained a bachelor's degree in Chemical Sciences from the University of El Salvador. He has served as a professor of Organic Chemistry at the aforementioned University.

Barton has officiated in national team tournaments, such as the 2018 Concacaf Under-20 Championship in the United States, the 2019 CONCACAF Gold Cup, the CONCACAF Nations League, and the 2019 FIFA U-17 World Cup in Brazil. He refereed in the first leg of the 2022 CONCACAF Champions League Final between Seattle Sounders FC and UNAM, where he awarded three penalties.

In May 2022, Barton was chosen as one of the referees to officiate at the 2022 FIFA World Cup in Qatar.

References

Salvadoran football referees
1991 births
Living people
Sportspeople from Santa Ana, El Salvador